Nat or NAT may refer to:

Computing
 Network address translation (NAT), in computer networking

Organizations
 National Actors Theatre, New York City, U.S.
 National AIDS trust, a British charity
 National Archives of Thailand
 National Assembly of Thailand, the national parliament

People and ethnic groups
 Nat (name), a given name or nickname, usually masculine, and also a surname
 Nat (Muslim), a Muslim community in North India
 Nat caste, a Hindu caste found in northern India and Nepal

Places 
 Nat, Punjab, India, a village
 Nat, West Virginia, United States, an unincorporated community
 Greater Natal International Airport, São Gonçalo do Amarante, Brazil (IATA code NAT)
 Augusto Severo International Airport (closed), former IATA code NAT

Science and technology

Biology and medicine
 Natural antisense transcript, an RNA transcript in a cell
 N-acetyltransferase, an enzyme; also NAT1, NAT2, etc. 
 Nucleic acid test, for genetic material
 Neonatal alloimmune thrombocytopenia, a disease
 Noradrenaline transporter (NAT), also called norepinephrine transporter (NET)
 Nucleobase ascorbate transporter (NAT) family, or Nucleobase cation symporter-2 (NCS2) family

Other uses in science and technology
 Nat (unit), a logarithmic unit of information or entropy
 Nottingham Asphalt Tester

Other uses
 Nat (deity), deities worshipped in Myanmar and neighboring countries
 Nat (Wild Cards), the nature of some characters in the Wild Card novels
 Nat Smurfling, a fictional character from The Smurfs 
 NAT: An Orchestral Portrait of Nat "King" Cole, a 1966 album by Nelson Riddle
 National Achievement Test, in the Philippines
 North Atlantic Tracks, a set of flight routes

See also

 Gnat (disambiguation)
 NATS (disambiguation)
 Nath (disambiguation)
 National (disambiguation)